DXIP (900 kHz Davao City) El Nuevo Bantay Radyo was an AM station owned by Southern Broadcasting Network and affiliated with Bantay Radyo. The station's studio was located along 3rd Floor, Lachmi Shopping Mall, Bolton in Davao City. The main format of the station was music, public service and news. This station is permanently closed since 2009.

Current/past personalities
Darrel Calamba
Rick Torrecampo

References

Radio stations in Davao City
News and talk radio stations in the Philippines
Radio stations established in 1957